Hou Yong may refer to:

Hou Yong (cinematographer) (born 1960), Chinese cinematographer
Hou Yong (actor) (born 1967), Chinese actor